Denise Benning (born September 1, 1967) is a Canadian former competitive pair skater. With her skating partner, Lyndon Johnston, she is the 1985 NHK Trophy bronze medalist, the 1985 Skate Canada International bronze medalist, the 1986 Skate America silver medalist, and a three-time Canadian national medalist (silver in 1986 and 1987, bronze in 1988). The pair finished fifth at three consecutive World Championships and sixth at the 1988 Winter Olympics in Calgary.

Benning won three consecutive national fours titles with Johnston and other skaters, from 1986 to 1988.

Results
pairs with Lyndon Johnston

References

1967 births
Living people
Canadian female pair skaters
Figure skaters at the 1988 Winter Olympics
Olympic figure skaters of Canada
Sportspeople from Windsor, Ontario